Siti Fauziah Sheikh Abdul Latiff, better known as Fauziah Latiff, is a Malaysian singer and actress. One of Latiff's first public performance was at a charity concert at Stadium Merdeka in 1987. Talent scouts from Happy Records spotted her and offered her her first recording contract. She is referred to as "Jee" by her fans.

Discography
Fauziah Latiff has released more than seventeen albums. Her first single was Digamit Memori.
 Digamit Memori (1988)
 Kau Merubah Segalanya (1989)
 Kini (1990)
 Tiada Noktah Cinta (1991)
 Gubahan Rindu Puisi Syahdu (1992)
 Epilog Memori Gelita (1993)
 Apa Sebenarnya (1994)
 Petikan Syahdu Fauziah Latiff (1995)
 Sahabat (1995)
 Petikan Syahdu Fauziah Latiff Vol. II (1996)
 Fauziah Latiff Dia (1997)
 Jee '98 (1998)
 Fauziah Latiff No. 1 (1999)
 Yang Lebih Kau Cinta... Jee (2001)
 Di Sebalik (compilation – 2004)
 Pesona (2006) with collaborated Jim Brickman
 Keunggulan (2010)

Fauziah Latiff also releases the following singles and soundtracks;

 Ku di Sini, which was the soundtrack to a drama series, Gelora Di Hati Sara 2 (2010)
 Takdir Cinta, which was the soundtrack to a drama series, Seindah Takdir Cinta (2016)
 Tanpa Noktah, which was a duet with Roy Sta Maria (2021)
 Suka-suka, which was a duet with Roy Sta Maria (2021) and both is soundtrack for drama Kerana Dia Aku Suka 2022 

Unfortunately, these singles are not available for streaming on popular platforms such as Spotify. They are only available on YouTube.

Vocal Profile
 Voice Type: Lyrical High Soprano
 High Notes: Gubahan Rindu Puisi Syahdu (F5). In falsetto, she relies on D6.
 Low Notes: Yang Lebih Kau Cinta (C#3)
 Vocal Range: 2.8 octave (C#3-D6)

Malaysian Idol judge
Fauziah is one of the three judges of Malaysian Idol, a series of reality singing competition.

Acting career
Drama
 Lontong as Sabariah (1995)
 Gelora Di Hati Sara Season 1-2, as Sara (2008/2010)
 Roda-Roda Kuala Lumpur Season 7 (finale), as Inspector Fauziah (2013)
Tahyul as Qaseh Syuhada (2021)
Kalung as Hasnah (2020)
Theatre
 Muzikal Tun Abdul Razak as Rahah Noah (2009)
 Rubiah as Rubiah (1999)

Telemovie
Kudrat Iman as Mahani (2008)
Ke Pintu Bahagia as Raudhah (2013)
 Korban Penunggu Hospital as Kesuma (2017)
 Kerana ku Mencintai mu as Maryam (2019)
Jangan Malu Menangis as Haryati (2022)

Program TV Show 
Malaysian Idol Season 1-2,2004/2005 as judge
Akademi Fantasia Season 5 as Judge 
Sepahtu Reunion Live,Season 2017 & 2019 as guest
Mikrofon Impian Season 1-2,2019/2021 as judge
Immortal Song Malaysia,2020 as judge
I Can See Your Voice Malaysia,2021 as guest
Masak Itu Senang as host, 2021
Keringat Selebriti Season 2,2021 as guest
Roda Panas 2,2022 as guest (rider)

Films
Pak Tam Duda (1988) as herself cameo
Nadia (1992) as herself cameo 
Mahathir The Journey (2022 or 2023) as Tun Dr Siti Hasmah

References

External links
 Archived biography from Malaysian Idol

1970 births
Living people
Malaysian people of Malay descent
Malaysian people of Arab descent
Malaysian film actresses
Malaysian television actresses
Malaysian women pop singers
Malaysian Muslims
Malaysian television personalities
People from Perak
Malay-language singers
Malaysian stage actresses
Malaysian Idol
Akademi Fantasia
21st-century Malaysian women singers
Universal Music Group artists